The mayoral election of 1941 in Pittsburgh, Pennsylvania, was held on Tuesday, November 4, 1941. Incumbent Democratic Party Conn Scully won a second full term by a narrow margin.

Background
Scully had gained a reputation as a weak mayor and his Republican opponent, wealthy attorney and former Pittsburgh Public Safety Director Harmar Denny (a future Congressman), hammered Scully for being a puppet of the city's increasingly powerful Democratic machine. Despite these allegations, Scully remained closely aligned with state party chairman (and future mayor) David Lawrence; while this may have cost him some votes, it gave him enough support from the Democrats' New Deal labor base to put Scully over the top. Republicans contested the result in court, but a judge dismissed the suit.

Results

These numbers, reported a day after the election, were officially revised later in the month. After a court found irregularities, it ordered further corrections.

References

External links
 

1941 Pennsylvania elections
1941 United States mayoral elections
1941
1940s in Pittsburgh
November 1941 events